Ermedin Demirović (born 25 March 1998) is a Bosnian professional footballer who plays as a forward for Bundesliga club FC Augsburg and the Bosnia and Herzegovina national team.

Demirović started his professional career at RB Leipzig, playing mainly in its reserve team. In 2017, he joined Alavés, who loaned him to Sochaux the following year, to Almería a year later and to St. Gallen later that year. Demirović moved to SC Freiburg in 2020. Two years later, he switched to FC Augsburg.

A former youth international for Bosnia and Herzegovina, Demirović made his senior international debut in 2021.

Club career

Early career
Demirović started playing football at his hometown club Hamburger SV, before joining RB Leipzig's youth academy in the summer of 2014. He made his professional debut playing for RB Leipzig II against ZFC Meuselwitz on 13 April 2017 at the age of 19 and managed to score a goal.

Alavés and loans
On 30 May 2017, Demirović moved to Spanish side Alavés on a four-year contract. After initial problems with registration, he first played for Alavés B.

Demirović made his first-team debut in a Copa del Rey win over Formentera on 3 January 2018 and scored a brace. He made his league debut against Barcelona three weeks later. He scored his first league goal in a defeat of Málaga on 6 May.

On 23 July 2018, Demirović extended his contract until June 2021. The following day, he was loaned to French outfit Sochaux until the end of season.

In January 2019, he was sent on a six-month loan to Almería.

On 2 September 2019, Demirović was sent on a season-long loan to Swiss team St. Gallen.

SC Freiburg
In July 2020, Bundesliga club SC Freiburg announced Demirović would join after the conclusion of the Swiss Super League season on 3 August. Media reported the transfer fee paid to Alavés as about €4 million plus bonuses. He made his competitive debut for the club in DFB-Pokal game against Waldhof Mannheim on 13 September. Two weeks later, he made his league debut against VfL Wolfsburg. On 20 December, he scored his first goal for SC Freiburg in a victory over Hertha BSC.

FC Augsburg
In July 2022, Demirović moved to FC Augsburg on a four-year deal with Michael Gregoritsch moving the other way as part of the transfer.

International career
Demirović represented Bosnia and Herzegovina on all youth levels.

In November 2018, he received his first senior call-up, for a 2018–19 UEFA Nations League match against Austria and a friendly match against Spain, but had to wait until 24 March 2021 to make his debut in 2022 FIFA World Cup qualifier against Finland.

Career statistics

Club

International

Scores and results list Bosnia and Herzegovina's goal tally first, score column indicates score after each Demirović goal.

References

External links

1998 births
Living people
Footballers from Hamburg
Citizens of Bosnia and Herzegovina through descent
Bosnia and Herzegovina footballers
Bosnia and Herzegovina international footballers
Bosnia and Herzegovina youth international footballers
Bosnia and Herzegovina under-21 international footballers
German footballers
German people of Bosnia and Herzegovina descent
Bosnia and Herzegovina expatriate footballers
German expatriate footballers
Association football forwards
RB Leipzig II players
Deportivo Alavés B players
Deportivo Alavés players
FC Sochaux-Montbéliard players
UD Almería players
FC St. Gallen players
SC Freiburg players
FC Augsburg players
Regionalliga players
Tercera División players
La Liga players
Ligue 2 players
Segunda División players
Swiss Super League players
Bundesliga players
Expatriate footballers in Spain
Expatriate footballers in France
Expatriate footballers in Switzerland
Bosnia and Herzegovina expatriate sportspeople in Germany
Bosnia and Herzegovina expatriate sportspeople in Spain
Bosnia and Herzegovina expatriate sportspeople in France
Bosnia and Herzegovina expatriate sportspeople in Switzerland